The 1984 United States Senate election in Alaska was held on November 6, 1984. Incumbent Republican Senator Ted Stevens sought re-election to a fourth term in the United States Senate. Owing to his popularity and the conservative bent of Alaska, Stevens did not face major opposition, and easily defeated former Alaska Attorney General John Havelock in the general election.

Open primary

Candidates

Democratic
 John Havelock, former Attorney General of Alaska
 Dave Carlson, former congressional candidate
 Michael Beasley, perennial candidate
 Joe Tracanna
 Phil Stoddard

Republican
 Ted Stevens, incumbent Senator since 1968

Results

General election

Results

See also 
 1984 United States Senate elections

References 

1984 Alaska elections
Alaska
1984